2001 Belfast riots may refer to:
 Holy Cross dispute
 July 2001 Belfast riots
 November 2001 Belfast riots